Grant Hodges is an American politician. He served as a Republican member for the 96th district of the Arkansas House of Representatives.

Born in Ozark, Missouri. Hodges attended the University of Arkansas, where he earned a bachelor's degree and master's degree in political science. In 2015, he was elected to represent the 96th district of the Arkansas House of Representatives, succeeding Duncan Baird. In 2020, Hodges decided not to run for office again, and he took a position at Northwest Arkansas Community College as its executive director of community and government relations and marketing. He was succeeded as state representative  for the 96th district by Joshua Bryant.

References 

Living people
People from Ozark County, Missouri
Year of birth missing (living people)
Republican Party members of the Arkansas House of Representatives
21st-century American politicians
University of Arkansas alumni